No Self Control may refer to:
 No Self Control (album), by The Planet Smashers, 2001
 "No Self Control" (The Pillows  song), 1999
 "No Self Control" (Peter Gabriel song), 1979

See also
Self control (disambiguation)